Atrypanius scitulus is a species of longhorn beetle of the subfamily Lamiinae. It was described by Ernst Friedrich Germar in 1824 and is known from eastern Brazil, eastern Ecuador, and French Guiana.

References

Beetles described in 1824
Beetles of South America
Acanthocinini